Ratha Thilagam is a 1963 Indian Tamil-language romantic war film directed by Dada Mirasi. The film stars Sivaji and Savitri Ganesan (no relation). Based on the Sino-Indian border dispute of 1962, it was released on 14 September 1963. The film was not commercially successful.

Plot 

Kumar is a graduate who decides to enlist in the Indian Army, following news of Chinese invasion in the country during the midst of the Sino-Indian War, only to find out that his love interest Kamala was working against the Indian Army.

Cast 
Sivaji Ganesan as Major Kumar
Savitri Ganesan as Kamala
Nagesh as Madurai
Kannappa as a Chinese doctor

Veerasami
Shanmugasundaram as Chinese military officer
Parthiban

Pushpalatha
Manorama as Poonkuyil
Janaki
Ennatha Kannaiya as Milltry Rajarathnam
Comedy Shanmugam as Madurai Assistant
kundu Karuppaiya as Kumar Hostel servant

Production 
Ratha Thilagam is based on the Sino-Indian border dispute of 1962. It was directed by Dada Mirasi who also wrote the screenplay. It was produced under National Movies by Panchu Arunachalam and P. V. Krishnan while Kannadasan, along with, P.C. Ganesan and Thyagan wrote the dialogue; Kannadasan also presented the film. Cinematography was handled by Jagirdhar and editing by R. Devarajan.

Themes 
Critic Baradwaj Rangan noted Ratha Thilagams similarities to the Bengali film Saptapadi (1961) in that both films had "the backdrop of war, the star-crossed lovers, and, of course, the staging of Othello, which, in both films, appears to have been dubbed by the same voices (Jennifer Kapoor, Utpal Dutt)." Writing for The Times of India, Ganesh Krishnamoorthy felt that, as the film was set in the backdrop of the Sino-Indian War, "this scene, used as a play enacted by the characters, provides a structural unity to the main plot."

Soundtrack 
The music was composed by K. V. Mahadevan, with lyrics by Kannadasan. The songs "Oru Koppaiyila" and "Pasumai Niraintha" were well received.

Release and reception 
Ratha Thilagam was released on 14 September 1963. Kanthan of Kalki praised the film for the comedy subplot and the Othello play. T. M. Ramachandran, writing for Sport and Pastime, commended Ganesan and Savitri's performances, calling their roles in the Othello play the film's pièce de résistance. The film was not commercially successful.

References

External links 
 

1960s Tamil-language films
1963 war films
1963 films
Films scored by K. V. Mahadevan
Films set in 1962
Films set in China
Films set in India
Indian Army in films
Indian historical films
Indian history in popular culture
Indian war films
Sino-Indian War films
War epic films
War films based on actual events
War romance films